Civitella del Tronto is a town and comune in the province of Teramo, within the Abruzzo region of central Italy. It is in the Gran Sasso e Monti della Laga National Park.

History
The origins of Civitella are unknown, though in the area have been found traces of human presence as early as the Neolithic and Upper Palaeolithic ages. The current town is believed to lie on the former Beregra, a town of the Piceni Italic tribe. It is first mentioned in the 10th-11th centuries, as a walled town; in the 13th century it was part of the Kingdom of Naples, having a special importance as it was on the boundaries with the Papal States.

In 1557 it was besieged by French troops, but in vain. Thanks to its fierce resistance, it was given the title of Fidelissima ("Very Faithful") by King Philip II of Spain (at the time southern Italy was under Spanish control). Civitella was besieged again by the French during the Napoleonic Wars, in 1798 and 1806, this time being captured after four months of defence. In 1816, after the Congress of Vienna, it was annexed to the Kingdom of the Two Sicilies.

The fortress of Civitella was the location of the last stand of that Kingdom after the Garibaldine and Piedmontese invasion of 1860, after the King Francis II had already surrendered in Gaeta, Naples and Sicily being annexed to the newly formed Kingdom of Italy. Civitella surrendered on 20 March 1861.

Main sights
The Fortress of Civitella is the largest in Italy, the second in Europe after the Hohensalzburg in Salzburg, Austria.

The town has the following churches:
San Francesco: built in 1326 in Gothic-Romanesque style, while the interior is Baroque
San Lorenzo: rebuilt in the 18th century in Baroque style, but maintaining the Renaissance façade.
Santa Maria degli Angeli (15th-16th centuries)
Sanctuary and Convent of Santa Maria dei Lumi: (1466) It includes a Romanesque portico and a polychrome wooden statue of the Madonna dei Lumi, dating to 1489.
Abbey of Santa Maria in Montesanto: Founded, according to the legend, by St. Benedict of Nursia himself in 542, in the 12th century it was one of the most powerful abbeys in the region; it started to decay from the late 15th century.

The surrounding mountains have karst topography in the landscapes of the Montagna dei Fiori.

Twin towns
 Salzburg, Austria, since 1989
 Ascoli Piceno, Italy

See also
Matteo Wade, the Irish commander of the Civitella fortress in the 1806 siege.

Cities and towns in Abruzzo